The following is a list of the Albania national football team's competitive records and statistics.
The page is updated where necessary after each Albania match, and is correct as of 13 June 2022.

Honours
 Balkan Cup
 Winner (1): 1946
 Fifth place (2): 1947, 1948

 Malta (Rothmans) International Tournament
 Winner (1): 2000
 Third place (1): 1998

Individual records

Appearances
 Most appearances

As of 19 November 2022, the players with the most caps for Albania are:

 Longest Albania career
 Erjon Bogdani, 16 years 11 months 2 days, 24 April 1996 – 26 March 2013

 Youngest player
 Iljaz Çeço, 17 years 4 months 20 days, 24 May 1964, 0–2 vs. Netherlands

 Oldest player
Foto Strakosha, 39 years 10 months 17 days, 9 February 2005, 0–2 vs. Ukraine

 Oldest debutant
 Orges Shehi, 33 years 1 month 28 days, 17 November 2010, 0–0 vs. Macedonia

 Most consecutive Albania's matches played
 Etrit Berisha, 40

Appearances in three different decades
Blendi Nallbani, 1980s, 1990s, 2000s
Arjan Xhumba, 1980s, 1990s, 2000s
Erjon Bogdani, 1990s, 2000s, 2010s
Altin Lala, 1990s, 2000s, 2010s
Arjan Beqaj, 1990s, 2000s, 2010s

 Most appearances at the FIFA World Cup qualifiers
Ervin Skela & Lorik Cana both at 28.

 Most appearances at the UEFA European Championship
Etrit Berisha, Armando Sadiku, Elseid Hysaj, Amir Abrashi, Ansi Agolli, Mërgim Mavraj, Ermir Lenjani & Odise Roshi, all at 3.

 Most appearances at the UEFA European Championship qualifying
Foto Strakosha & Altin Lala both at 29.

 Most appearances at the UEFA European Championship and UEFA European Championship qualifying
Lorik Cana, 29.

 Most minutes played in European Championship matches
Etrit Berisha, Elseid Hysaj, Amir Abrashi, Ansi Agolli & Mërgim Mavraj, all at 270 minutes.

 Most UEFA European Championships played in
20 players all at 1.

 Most appearances in the UEFA Nations League
 Berat Djimsiti & Frédéric Veseli, 12

 Most appearances at the Balkan Cup
Loro Boriçi, Muhamet Dibra, Aristidh Parapani, Vasif Biçaku & Sllave Llambi, all at 10.

 Most Balkan Cup played in
Loro Boriçi, Muhamet Dibra, Aristidh Parapani, Vasif Biçaku, Sllave Llambi, Rexhep Spahiu, Bahri Kavaja, Giacomo Poselli, Bimo Fakja & Besim Fagu, all at 3.

 Most appearances at the Malta (Rothmans) International Tournament
Rudi Vata 5.

 Most Malta (Rothmans) International Tournament played in
Rudi Vata, Arjan Beqaj & Armir Grimaj, all at 2.

 Most appearances at the Summer Olympics qualifications
Panajot Pano 4.

 Most appearances as a substitute at the UEFA European Championship
Odise Roshi 2

 Most UEFA European Championships matches won
14 players, all at 1

 Most appearances as a substitute
 Odise Roshi, 32

 Oldest player to feature at the UEFA European Championship
Orges Shehi, 38 years 8 month 24 days, 19 June 2016, 1–0 vs. Romania

 Youngest player to feature at the UEFA European Championship
 Elseid Hysaj, 22 years 4 month 9 days, 11 June 2016, 1–0 vs. Switzerland

Goals
 First goal
 Qamil Teliti, 22 August 1946, 5–0 vs. Montenegro

 Most goals
 Erjon Bogdani, 18, 24 April 1996 – 26 March 2013

 Most goals at the UEFA European Championship
Armando Sadiku 1

 Most goals at a single UEFA European Championship
Armando Sadiku 1

 Most goals at the UEFA European Championship and the UEFA European Championship qualifying
Armando Sadiku 2

 Most goals in UEFA European Championship qualifying
Edmond Kapllani, 5.

 First goal in a UEFA European Championship match
Armando Sadiku, 19 June 2016, 1–0 vs. Romania.

 First goal in a UEFA European Championship qualifying match
Panajot Pano, 30 October 1963, 1–0 vs. Denmark

 Most goals in FIFA World Cup qualifiers
Erjon Bogdani 8.

 First goal in a FIFA World Cup qualifiers match
Robert Jashari, 7 May 1965, 1–4 vs. Northern Ireland.

 Most goals at the UEFA Nations League
 Sokol Cikalleshi, 4

 Most goals at a single UEFA Nations League
 Sokol Cikalleshi, 4.

 First goal in a UEFA Nations League match
 Taulant Xhaka, 7 September 2018, 1–0 vs. Israel.

 Most goals at the Balkan Cup
 Loro Boriçi & Pal Mirashi, all at 3.

 Most goals at a single Balkan Cup
 Loro Boriçi, Pal Mirashi & Qamil Teliti, all at 2.

 First goal in a Balkan Cup
 Pal Mirashi, 7 October 1946, 1–1 vs. Yugoslavia.

 Most goals at the Malta (Rothmans) International Tournament
 Bledar Kola 2.

 Most goals at a single Malta (Rothmans) International Tournament
 Bledar Kola 2

 First goal in a Malta (Rothmans) International Tournament match
 Ilir Shulku, 6 February 1998, 1–1 vs. Malta.

 Most goals at the Football Summer Olympics qualifications
 Medin Zhega & Panajot Pano, all at 1.

 First goal in a Football Summer Olympics qualifications match
 Medin Zhega, 18 April 1971, 1–2 vs. Romania.

Most goals at the Bahrain Shoot Soccer Tournament
 Indrit Fortuzi 1.

 First goal in a Bahrain Shoot Soccer Tournament
 Indrit Fortuzi, 7 January 2002, 1–1 vs. Finland.

 Fastest goal
 Jahmir Hyka, 42 seconds, 20 August 2008, 2–0 vs. Liechtenstein

Fastest goal by a substitute
 Rey Manaj, 12 seconds, 13 November 2015, 2–2 vs. Kosovo.

 Oldest goalscorer
Erjon Bogdani, 35 years 10 month, 23 days, 6 February 2013, 1–2 vs. Georgia

 Youngest goalscorer
Haxhi Ballgjini, 18 years 4 months 19 days, 3 November 1976, 3–0 vs. Algeria

 Oldest goalscorer at the UEFA European Championship
Armando Sadiku, 25 years 23 days, 19 June 2016, 1–0 vs. Romania

 Youngest goalscorer in a UEFA European Championship
Armando Sadiku, 25 years 23 days, 19 June 2016, 1–0 vs. Romania

 Most goals by a midfielder
Ervin Skela 13

 Most goals by a defender
Adrian Aliaj 8

 Most goals from a penalty kick
Ervin Skela 4.

 Most goals from a penalty kick in a single match
Ervin Skela & Bledar Kola, both at 2.

 Most goals by a substitute
Erjon Bogdani 4

Goalkeeping
 Most clean sheets
Etrit Berisha, 32

 Longest unbeaten streak
Arjan Beqaj, 552 minutes

 Least number of goals conceded in a single UEFA European Championship by a starting goalkeeper
Etrit Berisha, 3

 Most clean sheets in a single UEFA European Championship
Etrit Berisha, 1

 Most consecutive clean sheets at the FIFA World Cup qualifiers
Thomas Strakosha, 3

 Most consecutive clean sheets at the UEFA European Championship qualifying
Arjan Beqaj, 4

 Most consecutive clean sheets at the UEFA Nations League
Etrit Berisha, 2

 Longest unbeaten streak at the UEFA European Championship
Etrit Berisha, 174 minutes

 Longest unbeaten streak in UEFA European Championship qualifying matches
Arjan Beqaj, 451 minutes

 Longest unbeaten streak in UEFA European Championship and UEFA European Championship qualifying matches
Etrit Berisha, 95 minutes

 Longest unbeaten streak in FIFA World Cup qualifiers matches
Etrit Berisha, 267 minutes

 Longest unbeaten streak in the UEFA Nations League
Etrit Berisha, 227 minutes

 Most penalty kicks saved
 Perlat Musta & Samir Ujkani, 2

 Most penalty kicks saved at the FIFA World Cup qualifying
 Ilion Lika & Alban Hoxha, 1

 Most penalty kicks saved at the UEFA European Championship qualifiers
 Perlat Musta, 2

 Most penalty kicks saved in a single match
 Samir Ujkani, 2, 29 February 2012, vs. Georgia

 Youngest goalkeeper to feature in a match
Qemal Vogli, 17 years 7 months 26 days, 25 May 1947, vs. Romania.

Coaching
 Most manager appearances on the Albania bench
Gianni De Biasi, 52.

 Most UEFA European Championship appearances as a manager
Gianni De Biasi, 3

Captains
 First captain
 Loro Boriçi, 22 August 1946, 5–0 vs. Montenegro

 Most appearances as captain
 Lorik Cana, 41

Most appearances as captain as a goalkeeper
 Etrit Berisha, 20

Most appearances as captain at the UEFA European Championship
 Ansi Agolli, 3

Longest serving captain
 Loro Boriçi, 1946–1953

List of captaincy periods of the various captains throughout the years.

 1946–1953 Loro Boriçi
 1946      → Bahri Kavaja (Vice-captain)
 1958 Besim Fagu
 1963–1964 Fatbardh Deliallisi
 1964–1970 Lin Shllaku
 1967      → Mikel Janku (Vice-captain)
 1970–1973 Panajot Pano
 1971      → Bashkim Muhedini (Vice-captain)
 1973      → Ramazan Rragami (Vice-captain)
 1976      Sabah Bizi
 1980–1981 Safet Berisha
 1982      Ilir Luarasi
 1982–1985 Muhedin Targaj
 1983      → Haxhi Ballgjini (Vice-captain)
 1986–1989 Arben Minga
 1987     → Perlat Musta (Vice-captain)
 1987     → Shkëlqim Muça (Vice-captain)
 1989–1990 Skënder Hodja
 1990–1995 Sulejman Demollari
 1990–1991 → Hysen Zmijani (Vice-captain)
 1992      → Agustin Kola (Vice-captain)
 1993      → Sokol Kushta (Vice-captain)
 1995      → Foto Strakosha (Vice-captain)
 1995      → Ilir Shulku (Vice-captain)
 1995–1996 Sokol Kushta
 1996      → Foto Strakosha (Vice-captain)
 1997–2002 Rudi Vata
 2000      → Edvin Murati (Vice-captain)
 2001      → Foto Strakosha (Vice-captain)
 2002      → Indrit Fortuzi (Vice-captain)
 2002–2004 Foto Strakosha
 2004      → Besnik Hasi (Vice-captain)
 2005–2007 Igli Tare
 2005      → Altin Haxhi (Vice-captain)
 2005–2006 → Altin Lala (Vice-captain)
 2005      → Alban Bushi (Vice-captain)
 2005      → Besnik Hasi (Vice-captain)
 2007–2009 Altin Lala
 2007      → Klodian Duro (Vice-captain)
 2007      → Altin Haxhi (Vice-captain)
 2007–2009 → Ervin Skela (Vice-captain)
 2009–2011 Ervin Skela
 2009      → Elvin Beqiri (Vice-captain)
 2010–2011 → Altin Lala (Vice-captain)
 2010      → Lorik Cana (Vice-captain)
 2011     Altin Lala
 2011      → Lorik Cana (Vice-captain)
 2011      → Arjan Beqaj (Vice-captain)
 2011–2016 Lorik Cana
 2012–2013 → Ervin Bulku (Vice-captain)
 2013      → Erjon Bogdani (Vice-captain)
 2014      → Etrit Berisha (Vice-captain)
 2015–2016 → Ansi Agolli (Vice-captain)
 2016      → Ledian Memushaj (Vice-captain)
 2016      → Elseid Hysaj (Vice-captain)
 2016–2017 Ansi Agolli
 2016–2017 → Mërgim Mavraj (Vice-captain)
 2017      → Elseid Hysaj (Vice-captain)
 2017      → Etrit Berisha (Vice-captain)
 2017–2018 Etrit Berisha
 2018      → Odise Roshi (Vice-captain)
 2018      → Jahmir Hyka (Vice-captain)
 2018      → Elseid Hysaj (Vice-captain)
 2018–2019 Mërgim Mavraj
 2018–2019 → Elseid Hysaj (Vice-captain)
 2019      → Ledian Memushaj (Vice-captain)
 2019      → Amir Abrashi (Vice-captain)
 2019–2020 Elseid Hysaj
 2020– Etrit Berisha
 2020–2022 → Elseid Hysaj (Vice-captain)
 2021      → Amir Abrashi (Vice-captain)
 2022      → Sokol Cikalleshi (Vice-captain)
 2022      → Sherif Kallaku (Vice-captain)

Disciplinary
 Most yellow cards
 Lorik Cana, 26

 Most red cards
 Edvin Murati, 3

 First player to be sent off at a UEFA European Championship
Lorik Cana, double-yellow, 11 June 2016, vs. Switzerland.

Team records
 Venue most played in
 Qemal Stafa Stadium, 131.

 Largest victory
 5–0 vs. Vietnam, 12 February 2003
 6–1 vs. Cyprus, 12 August 2009
 5–0 vs. San Marino, 9 September 2021

 Largest unofficial victory
 5–0 vs. Montenegro, 22 September 1946

 Largest UEFA European Championship victory
 1–0 vs. Romania, 19 June 2016

 Largest defeat
 0–12 vs. Hungary, 24 September 1950

 Largest UEFA European Championship defeat
 0–2 vs. France, 15 June 2016

 Most total goals in a single match
 0–12 vs. Hungary, 24 September 1950

 Most consecutive victories
 4, achieved thrice, 9 October 1999 vs. Georgia – 10 February 2000 vs. Malta, 3 March 2010 vs. Northern Ireland – 11 August 2010 vs. Uzbekistan & 11 November 2020 vs. Kosovo – 3 March 2021 vs. Andorra

 Most consecutive defeats
 10, 8 March 1989 vs. England – 1 May 1991 vs. Czechoslovakia

 Most consecutive matches without victory
 25, 27 February 1985 vs. Greece – 1 May 1991 vs. Czechoslovakia

 Most consecutive matches without defeat
 8, 14 November 2009 vs. Estonia – 8 October 2010 vs. Bosnia and Herzegovina

 Most consecutive draws
 3, achieved twice, 23 May 1948 vs. Hungary – 23 October 1948  vs. Romania & 15 October 2008 vs. Portugal – 11 February 2009 vs. Malta

 Most consecutive matches without a draw
 18, 8 March 1989 vs. England – 9 September 1992 vs. Northern Ireland

 Most consecutive matches with at least one Albanian goal scored
 8, 10 September 2003 vs. Georgia – 3 September 2004 vs. Greece

 Most consecutive matches with no goals conceded on Albania
 5, achieved twice, 24 March 2007 vs. Slovenia – 22 August 2007 vs. Malta & 3 March 2010 vs. Northern Ireland – 11 August 2010 vs. Uzbekistan

Competition records

FIFA World Cup

UEFA European Championship

UEFA Nations League

Head-to-head records

Notes

References

National association football team records and statistics
 
Albania national football teams
records